Tonse Madhava Ananth Pai  (30 April 1898 – 29 May 1979), was an Indian physician, educationist, banker and philanthropist, most well-known for building the university town of Manipal, India.

He was the first to start a private, self-financing medical college offering MBBS in India. Pai established the Kasturba Medical College in 1953 and Manipal Institute of Technology in 1957, which was followed by a string of other education institutions including Manipal College of Dental Sciences, Manipal College of Pharmaceutical Sciences and Manipal Pre-University College. He, along with his brother Upendra Ananth Pai, also established Syndicate Bank originally in Udupi, Karnataka, which has its headquarters now in Manipal and Bangalore. He was responsible for its popular Pigmy Deposit Scheme.

Early life
Born in 1898, Tonse Madhava Ananta Pai belonged to a lower-middle-class household of Gowd Saraswath Brahmins of Kallianpur, a village from Manipal

Awards
Pai was conferred the Padma Shri by the Indian government in 1972. He was awarded the degree of D.Litt. by the Karnataka University, Dharwad in 1973 and the Andhra University, Visakhapatnam in 1975.

The Government of India brought out a stamp commemorating Pai on 9 October 1999. Pai has also been recognized by Ripley's Believe It or Not as the person who has established the most number of educational institutions in his lifetime.

References

See also 

 T. Mohandas Pai

1898 births
1979 deaths
People from Udupi
Manipal Academy of Higher Education alumni
Karnatak University alumni
Indian bankers
Businesspeople from Karnataka
Recipients of the Padma Shri in literature & education
20th-century Indian philanthropists
People from Udupi district